George Waters (25 July 1827 – 21 April 1905) was an Irish Liberal Party politician. He served at the Member of Parliament (MP) for Mallow, County Cork, from 1870 to 1872. He resigned to become Chairman of the Quarter-Sessions for Waterford. He resigned his position in 1892.

Educated at Trinity College Dublin, he was called to the Bar in 1849, and appointed a Queen's Counsel in 1869.

References

External links 
 

1827 births
1905 deaths
Alumni of Trinity College Dublin
Irish barristers
19th-century King's Counsel
Members of the Parliament of the United Kingdom for County Cork constituencies (1801–1922)
Irish Liberal Party MPs
Irish Queen's Counsel
UK MPs 1868–1874